Miladin Stevanović (born 11 February 1996) is a Serbian professional footballer who plays as a defender for Čukarički. He is capable of playing as a central defender or as a full-back on the right flank.

Club career

Partizan
Born in Bijeljina, Stevanović came to Partizan in August 2008, being registered for the first time. In August 2013, Stevanović signed his first professional contract with Partizan, on a three-year deal. Stevanović was immediately loaned to Teleoptik, alongside Miroslav Bogosavac.

Stevanović made his official debut for Partizan in a UEFA Europa League game against Beşiktaş on 23 October 2014. Three days later, Stevanović has played his first match in Serbian SuperLiga against Jagodina. On 6 November 2014, Stevanović has played his second match in 2014–15 UEFA Europa League against Beşiktaş at Atatürk Olympic Stadium 2–1 away defeat. On 20 March 2016, he scored his first competitive goal for the club and equalizer on the match in a 1–2 away win over Čukarički.

Čukarički
After a period he spent with Kayserispor between 2016 and 2017, Stevanović returned to the Serbian SuperLiga side Čukarički at the beginning of 2018. Stevanović made his debut for the club in 2–0 victory over Mačva Šabac on 17 February 2018.

International career
Stevanović represented Serbia at the 2014 UEFA Under-19 Championship, being eliminated in the semi-final by Portugal after a penalty shoot-out.

2015 World Cup U-20
On 10 June 2015, Stevanović made his debut in round of 16 on 2015 FIFA U-20 World Cup against Hungary as a substitute for Staniša Mandić.
On 14 June 2015 in quarter-finals, he played full 120 minutes against United States. On 20 June 2015, in the final, Serbia won against Brazil and won this tournament after 28 years. Alongside him, in Serbian winning side were two other Partizan players: Ivan Šaponjić and Andrija Živković.

Career statistics

Club

Honours
Partizan
 Serbian SuperLiga: 2014–15
 Serbian Cup: 2015–16

Serbia
 FIFA U-20 World Cup: 2015

Orders
Medal of Merit (Republika Srpska)

Notes and references

External links
 
 

1996 births
Living people
Serbian footballers
Association football defenders
FK Partizan players
FK Teleoptik players
FK Čukarički players
Kayserispor footballers
Serbia youth international footballers
Serbian First League players
Serbian SuperLiga players
Süper Lig players
Serbian expatriate footballers
Serbian expatriate sportspeople in Turkey
Expatriate footballers in Turkey
People from Bijeljina
Serbs of Bosnia and Herzegovina
Serbia under-21 international footballers